XDH may refer to:

 the XDH Assumption, or, the External Diffie-Hellman assumption, a mathematic assumption used in elliptic curve cryptography
 xanthine dehydrogenase, an enzyme